Larsen Hackworth (born  2004) is an American soccer player who currently plays for MLS Next Pro side St. Louis City SC 2.

Career

Early

St. Louis City 2
On March 10, 2023, Hackworth was announced as part of the second St. Louis City SC 2 roster in MLS Next Pro.

International

Personal life 

He is the son of John Hackworth current director of St. Louis City SC. His oldest brother Morgan Hackworth play for San Diego Loyal SC.

Career statistics

References

External links

2004 births
Living people
American soccer players
MLS Next Pro players
Association football midfielders
Soccer players from Missouri
St. Louis City SC 2 players